Antiphon of Athens, according to the Suda, was an interpreter of signs, epic poet and sophist, surnamed Logomageiros (Λογομάγειρος), which means both "Word-cook" and "Word-butcher." None of his works are extant, and he is only attested in the Suda.

Notes

Ancient Athenians
Sophists